Basil Ben Baldanza (born December 3, 1961) is an economist and was the chief executive officer and president of Spirit Airlines from 2005 to 2016, a period in which he led the transformation of the company into an ultra-low-cost carrier.

Biography

Early life 
Baldanza was born on December 3, 1961, in Rome, New York. In his youth, he played the trombone and briefly imagined a professional musical career. He later attended Syracuse University and graduated with a bachelor's degree in policy studies and economics in 1984. He earned his Master of Public Affairs degree at Princeton University in 1986.

Career 
In 1986, Baldanza began his career in the airline industry working for the American Airlines Group until 1991, where he was a member of chief executive officer Robert Crandall's, "Brat Pack", alongside Thomas W. Horton (former CEO of American), C. David Cush (former CEO of Virgin America) and Doug Parker (former CEO of American Airlines).

He was later employed by Northwest Airlines and after that briefly worked at the United Parcel Service. In 1994, he was hired by Continental Airlines as VP of Pricing, and soon was promoted to EVP of Marketing. By 1997, he left Continental to serve as the managing director and COO of TACA Airlines. While at Taca, he also served on the board of directors of Frontier Airlines. In the early 2000s, he served as senior vice president of Marketing and International Operations for US Airways during a troubling period when the company filed bankruptcy twice in as many years.

Baldanza left US Airways to become president and COO of Spirit Airlines in January 2005. He became chief executive officer of Spirit in 2006. At the time, the company was recording yearly losses of $79 million. During his tenure, Baldanza was “the public face of Spirit’s transformation into a more extreme version of a discount airline.” He designed a plan to transform it into an ultra-low-cost carrier. The company implemented a “Bare Fare” model, opting to charge airline fees for many services included in traditional airline fares. This included fees for the option to select a desired seat, food and drink, carry-on and checked baggages. On July 14, 2010, Baldanza testified in a U.S. Congress hearing in which he defended the airline's unpopular “policy to unbundle services not essential to passenger transport.” He has faced significant criticism stemming from transformation of the airline into an ultra-low-cost carrier. Baldanza has been largely unapologetic about his company's new pricing policy. He was even been featured in a 2010 video in which he placed himself inside an overhead bin to defend the airlines new policy on carry-on fees by saying “Had we not implemented this, there’s no telling what people would try to put in an overhead bin”.

The most reported criticism of Baldanza stemmed from his handling of customer complaints, especially his initial refusal to refund the fare of a terminally-ill military veteran in May 2012. The Vietnam veteran was diagnosed with cancer and was recently informed that it was terminal and that he was unfit to travel by plane. He requested for a refund and was refused. Baldanza initially defended his team's decision by stating that the customer purchased a nonrefundable fare with no insurance and therefore the company does not owe him a refund as that would be unfair to other customers. He faced criticism from veterans organizations including a social media campaign to boycott Spirit Airlines. Baldanza eventually apologized for failing to “demonstrate the respect or the compassion that [he] should have, given [the customer’s] medical condition and his service to [his] country.” He announced he would return the price of the fare from his own funds and that Spirit Airlines would make a donation to a veteran's group.

During his tenure, the airline had become profitable in “a period in which many airlines struggled to stay in business.” As of 2011, “Spirit earned 40% more per airplane than any other U.S. airline”. Baldanza and other executives at Spirit were paid less than others in the industry and but instead owned shares in the company. Baldanza often promoted terms such as “a bus with wings” and “dollar store of the sky” to describe the airline. He pushed for ways of offsetting costs by selling advertising spaces where ever available on the plane, including flight attendant aprons, seatback trays, overhead bins, napkins, cups and motion sickness bags. His company used advertising that often went viral instead of relying on a large marketing budget. Their advertisements often contained sexual innuendo as well as topical subjects in pop culture and politics.

In January 2016, Baldanza resigned from his position as chief executive officer and president of Spirit, after serving in the position for nearly a decade. The resignation was described by several news organizations as unexpected and abrupt. However, Baldanza stated that the move was part of “an orderly succession plan.” Spirit said that Baldanza had recently moved his family to Washington, D.C. He was replaced by Robert Fornaro, a member of the board that Baldanza personally recruited in 2014.

Baldanza owns Diemacher LLC as an advisory service. He currently serves on the board of JetBlue Airways, Six Flags Entertainment, and Go First. He serves as an Operating Partner with Sterling Investment Partners He is also an adjunct professor of economics at George Mason University. He co-hosts a weekly podcast called Airlines Confidential with long-time Wall Street Journal journalist Scott McCartney Baldanza is a Forbes.com contributor.

On November 15, 2021, Baldanza was elected as the non-executive chairman of the board of Six Flags Entertainment Corporation.

Charitable and philanthropic 
Baldanza and his wife support various Educational Institutions and Arts programs through the "Baldanzas Doing Good" fund.

He serves on Syracuse University's Maxwell School of Citizenship Advisory Board.

He also serves on the Princeton University Graduate Dean's Alumni Advisory Council.

Baldanza acts as Treasurer for the American Youth Philharmonic Orchestras  and serves on the Audit Committee for the International Trombone Association

Personal life 
Baldanza is married to Marcia Baldanza and they have a son.

He is first cousin to violinist Roberta Guaspari. Guaspari's father and Baldanza's mother were siblings.

He also owns a collection of thousands of board games which he enjoys playing. He is a voting member of the International Gamers Awards. His company, Diemacher LLC, is named after a famous strategy board game.

In 2022, Baldanza was diagnosed with ALS caused by a mutation in the C9orf72 gene.

References

External links 
 

Living people
1961 births
People from Rome, New York
Syracuse University alumni
Princeton School of Public and International Affairs alumni
George Mason University faculty
Six Flags people